Raoul Jonathan Larson (born 14 May 1984 in Katima Mulilo, Namibia) is a Namibian rugby union player. He competed with the Namibian national team at the 2011 Rugby World Cup where he played in three matches.  He is again included in the Namibian national team at the 2015 Rugby World Cup.

References

External links

2011 Rugby World Cup Profile

1984 births
Living people
Namibian rugby union players
Namibia international rugby union players
Free State Cheetahs players
Griffons (rugby union) players
Boland Cavaliers players
SWD Eagles players
Rugby union props
Alumni of Grey College, Bloemfontein
People from Katima Mulilo
White Namibian people
Namibian Afrikaner people